Major General Arthur Reginald Chater   (7 February 1896 – 3 January 1979) was an officer in the Royal Marines during the First World War, the interwar years, and Second World War.

Military career
Chater was commissioned into the Royal Marines in 1913. He served in the First World War and saw action at Antwerp with the Chatham Battalion of the Royal Marine Brigade in 1914. He fought on the Gallipoli Peninsula in Turkey from 28 April to 12 May 1915, and in March 1918 he participated in the Allied raid on Zeebrugge.

During the interwar period Chater served with the Egyptian Army and the Sudan Camel Corps. He became Commanding Officer of the Sudan Camel Corps in 1927, Commander of military operations in Kordofan in Sudan in 1929 and Senior Royal Marines Officer at the East Indies Station in 1931. He served in the Second World War as Military-Governor of British Somaliland from 1941, whose evacuation he oversaw following the Battle of Tug Argan, as Commander of the Portsmouth Division of the Royal Marines from 1943 and as Director of Combined Operations for India and South East Asia from 1944.

Papers related to his service are held in the Liddell Hart Centre for Military Archives, King's College London, and comprise notes on Operation Lightning for the capture of Akyab Island, Burma, on 3 January 1945; photographs of amphibious landings by 15 Indian Corps at Kangaw, Burma, January 1945; and notes on combined operations training of allied forces for Operation Zipper, the planned invasion of Malaya, August 1945.

He was made a companion of the Distinguished Service Order.
He became Commander of the Chatham Group of Royal Marines in 1946 and retired in 1948.

A road on the site of the former Royal Marine Infirmary Barracks in Deal, Kent, which was built in 1900 and demolished c.1990 was named Chater Court.

Honours
Chater was made a companion of the Order of the Bath, a commander of the Royal Victorian Order, and a member of the Order of the British Empire.

Honours and awards
 Companion of the Order of the Bath – January 1941 
 Commander of the Royal Victorian Order – June 1966
 Distinguished Service Order – July 1918
 Officer of the Order of the British Empire – June 1931

References

External links
Generals of World War II
Royal Marine Officers 1939−1945

Governors of British Somaliland
Somaliland Camel Corps officers
Sudan Defence Force officers
1896 births
1979 deaths
British Somaliland in World War II
East African campaign (World War II)
Royal Marines personnel of World War I
Royal Marines generals of World War II
Companions of the Order of the Bath
Commanders of the Royal Victorian Order
Companions of the Distinguished Service Order
Officers of the Order of the British Empire
Recipients of the Croix de Guerre 1914–1918 (France)
Collections of the Liddell Hart Centre for Military Archives
Royal Marines generals